The 1976 Greenlandic Men's Football Championship was the 6th edition of the Greenlandic Men's Football Championship. The final round was held in Nuuk. It was won by Grønlands Seminarius Sportklub for the fifth title in its history.

Final round

See also
Football in Greenland
Football Association of Greenland
Greenland national football team
Greenlandic Men's Football Championship

References

Greenlandic Men's Football Championship seasons
Green
Green
Football - Men